Arcey is a commune in the Côte-d'Or department in the Bourgogne-Franche-Comté region of eastern France.

Geography
Arcey is located some 3 km south-east of Sainte-Marie-sur-Ouche and 16 km west by south-west of Dijon. Access to the commune is by the D35 road from Pont-de-Pany in the north-west passing through the north of the commune and continuing south-east to Urcy. The D104 road forms most of the eastern border of the commune as it branches south from the D35 and continues to join the D8 south of the commune. Access to the village is by the country road Rue des Ecrevisses which branches off the D35 in the north and passes south through the length of the commune and the village. The commune is heavily forested with some areas of farmland in the centre near the village.

Neighbouring communes and villages

History

Heraldry

Administration

List of Successive Mayors

Demography
In 2017 the commune had 53 inhabitants.

Culture and heritage

Civil heritage
The commune has a number of buildings and structures that are registered as historical monuments:
A Lavoir (Public laundry) (19th century)
A House at Grande Rue (18th century)
A series of 5 Milestones of Justice (13th century)
Houses and Farms (18th-19th century)

Religious heritage

The commune has one religious building that is registered as an historical monument:
The Parish Church of the Nativity (15th century) The Church contains many items that are registered as historical objects:
2 Processional Candlesticks (19th century)
A Chasuble (18th century)
An Exhibition Throne (18th century)
The Furniture in the Church
A Processional Staff: Virgin and child (18th century)
A Painting: Saint Sebastian (19th century)
A Baptismal font (16th century)

See also
Communes of the Côte-d'Or department

References

External links
 Arcey on the National Geographic Institute website 
Arcey on Géoportail, National Geographic Institute (IGN) website 
Arcey on the 1750 Cassini Map

Communes of Côte-d'Or